Oxyopes salticus is a species of lynx spider, commonly known as the striped lynx spider, first described by Hentz in 1845. Its habitat tends to be grasses and leafy vegetation; grassy, weedy fields, and row crops.

Description
Adult specimens have some color variation between orange, cream and brown. Adult females typically have stripes on both the carapace and abdomen, though on many specimens, the stripes are more pronounced on the abdomen. There is a generally a diamond cardiac mark, and macrosetae covering legs I-IV. There is a broad clypeus. Adult females range in size from ~5-6mm, and adult males range in size ~4-5mm.

Range
Eastern United States from Massachusetts and Iowa south to Florida and Texas, along Mexican border, north along Pacific coast to Oregon. Also much of South and Central America Recently, O.salticus has been found in great numbers on the Big Island of Hawai'i as well as the island of Maui (see picture to the right).

Agricultural importance
A number of authors (Brady 1964, Laster and Brazzel 1968, McDaniel et al. 1981, Young and Lockley 1985) have noted the importance of Oxyopids as a major predator of economically important agricultural pests. In 1961, Kayashima released 45,000 O. sertatus spiders into a Cryptomeria forest in Japan (in a test plot) and noted a 53% reduction in damage by the gall midge Contarinia inouyei. Other studies in India (Sharma & Sarup, 1979; Rao et al., 1981) have noted similar results. However, some studies note that O. salticus (and other Oxyopids) also prey on beneficial insects (e.g., bees and other pollinators), so their importance in pest control is somewhat questioned.

Gallery

Footnotes

References
  (2009): The world spider catalog, version 9.5. American Museum of Natural History.
 Brady, A.A. (1964). The lynx spiders of North America, North of Mexico (Araneae: Oxyopidae). Bulletin of the Museum of Comparative Zoology. 131: 429–518.
 Kayashima, I. (1961). Study of the lynx spider, Oxyopes sertatus L. Koch, for biological control of the crytomerian leaf fly (Contarina inouyei Mani). Review of Applied Entomology, Series A, 51. 413.
 Weems, H. V. Jr. and Whitcomb, W. H. Green Lynx Spider, Peucetia viridans (Hentz) (Arachnida: Araneae: Oxyopidae). EENY-249 Entomology and Nematology Department, Florida Cooperative Extension Service, Institute of Food and Agricultural Sciences, University of Florida. Published: November 2001. Revised March 2011.
 Young, O.P.; Lockley T.C.(1985). The striped lynx spider,Oxyopes salticus [Araneae: Oxyopidae], in agroecosystems. Entomophaga 30(4): 329–346. Abstract
 

Oxyopidae
Spiders of North America
Spiders of Central America
Spiders of South America
Spiders described in 1845